Neil Royston Taylor (born 21 July 1959 in Farnborough, Kent), is a former cricketer who played first-class and List A cricket for Kent and Sussex for 20 seasons between 1979 and 1998.

He made his debut in 1979 and was an opening batsman and an occasional off-spin bowler. He played in 325 first-class matches, scoring 19,031 runs at an average of 39.56 with 45 centuries.  He later taught at St Dunstan's College.

References

External links

1959 births
Living people
Kent cricketers
People from Orpington
English cricketers
Sussex cricketers